Grand River National Grassland is a National Grassland in northwestern South Dakota, United States. It is named for the Grand River. The North and South forks of the rivers meet in the grassland. In descending order of acreage it lies in parts of Perkins, Corson, and Ziebach counties. The portion in Corson County also lies within the Standing Rock Indian Reservation. The portion in Ziebach County also lies within the Cheyenne River Indian Reservation.  

In the early 1900s, the area was settled by European immigrants under the Homestead Act. In the 1930s a severe drought along with high winds turned the area into a “Dust Bowl.” This time was known as the Great Depression and many of the settlers experienced great financial hardships Under the Agricultural Adjustment Act, the government purchased failed homesteads in order to minimize the economic hardships. These purchased lands were consolidated and rehabilitated and the administration was transferred to the Forest Service and formally designated the Grand River National Grassland in 1960.

The grassland is administered by the USDA-Forest Service as part of the Dakota Prairie Grasslands (DPG) from offices in Bismarck, North Dakota. There is a local Ranger District office (shared with Cedar River National Grassland) in Lemmon, South Dakota.  The DPG is part of Region One of the Forest Service.  The Regional Headquarters is in Missoula, MT.

Description
The District has a variety of habitats: mixed grass prairie, river bottom, green ash draws, sand dunes along the South Fork of the Grand River, badlands, sandstone outcrops and buttes, and claypan areas with a few small playas in Corson County. Approximately  of the District is old cropland that was reseeded to crested wheatgrass.  There have been 476 species from 78 families have been discovered so far. For birding enthusiasts, there is also a comprehensive birding checklist of the District.

The District has a  hiking, horseback riding and mountain biking trail south of Lemmon about  called the Blacktail Trail.  It is a loop trail.  The trail head is located adjacent to State Highway 73.  The trail takes you through mixed grass prairie and badlands and passes near one of only two aspen stands on the District. A picnic area and fishing area is also located at the trailhead.  A good gravel road connects the trial head to the highway.

The District also shares part of the shoreline of Shadehill Reservoir.  This area is accessible from South Dakota Highway 73, west of the highway.  This part of the lakeshore is adjacent to the South Cabin sites. Camping is free.  A good gravel shoreline is available for fishing.  As you travel on most of the grasslands, it is all open to livestock grazing, so you will have to share it with cattle.  This includes the roadways.

Recent projects on the District include planting cottonwoods along the South Fork of the Grand River and revamping crested wheatgrass stands with native seedings.

References

External links
 Dakota Prairie Grasslands
 Map showing free dispersed camping areas and location of Hugh Glass campground (free, down road 5622, marked by sign as Hugh Glass road)
 List of plant species of the Grand River National Grassland
 List of bird species of the Grand River National Grassland and Cedar River National Grassland.

Protected areas of Corson County, South Dakota
National Grasslands of the United States
Protected areas of Perkins County, South Dakota
Protected areas of Ziebach County, South Dakota
Grasslands of South Dakota